The Old Wellington Inn is a half-timbered pub in Manchester city centre, England, United Kingdom. It is part of Shambles Square, which was created in 1999, and is near Manchester Cathedral. It is a Grade II listed building.

History 

The oldest building of its kind in Manchester, the Old Wellington Inn was built in 1552 next to the market square which led off what is now Market Street, in what was known as the Shambles. In 1554 part of it became a draper's shop, owned by the Byrom family, and the writer John Byrom was born there in 1692. The building had a third storey added to it in the 17th century. In 1830 the building became a licensed public house, known as the Vintners Arms, and later the Kenyon Vaults. By 1865, the ground floor of the building was known as the Wellington Inn, while the upper floors were used by makers of mathematical and optical instruments. Later, in 1897, the upper floors were used as a fishing tackle shop, known as "Ye Olde Fyshing Tackle Shoppe".

On July 22, 1971 the process began of elevating the Old Shambles to order to fit with the development of 'The Market Place Centre'. This separate development was intended to provide a single level walk, from the Arndale Centre; to which it was connected by a glass bridge over Corporation Street, and then on to Deansgate. The Wellington was underpinned with a concrete raft, designed by draughtsman Fred Kennedy, then raised half inch by half inch using hydraulic jacks for 3 months, until October 27 when it had been sufficiently raised a total of five feet [1.5m]. 
The Inn was reopened in 1981. But what was not appreciated by most was the extent to which the building had been changed. Prior to the jacking operation, the entire internal structure of the whole block was removed and replaced by an internal, steel bracing framework. Only the curtain walling remained of the original Tudor building. Moreover, when rebuilt it was necessary to do so to all the latest building regulations. Originally, due to centuries of settlement, there was not a straight line in the place. The floors, ceilings and windows were all awry, and there were several low beams in the bar area which had to be ducked under by all but the shortest clientele. The main one bore the legend 'Duck or Grouse.' In its new position, built onto the rear of the Marks & Spencer's store, at first-floor level, it was all but a new building. All the eccentric charm had gone. It was damaged in the 1996 Manchester bombing, and was reopened in February 1997, with costs of £500,000 paid to repair the damage. However, in preparation for the city's development in the bomb's aftermath, it was decided that the building, alongside its neighbour Sinclair's Oyster Bar, should be dismantled and rebuilt  towards the cathedral to form Shambles Square. The move was completed by November 1999, when the pub reopened.

See also

Listed buildings in Manchester-M3

References 
Notes

Sources

Grade II listed buildings in Manchester
Pubs in Manchester
Buildings and structures completed in 1552
Relocated buildings and structures in the United Kingdom
Grade II listed pubs in Greater Manchester
1552 establishments in England